Nvidia Tesla was the name of Nvidia's line of products targeted at stream processing or general-purpose graphics processing units (GPGPU), named after pioneering electrical engineer Nikola Tesla. Its products began using GPUs from the G80 series, and have continued to accompany the release of new chips. They are programmable using the CUDA or OpenCL APIs.

The Nvidia Tesla product line competed with AMD's Radeon Instinct and Intel Xeon Phi lines of deep learning and GPU cards.

Nvidia retired the Tesla brand in May 2020, reportedly because of potential confusion with the brand of cars.  Its new GPUs are branded Nvidia Data Center GPUs, as in the Ampere A100 GPU.

Overview

Offering computational power much greater than traditional microprocessors, the Tesla products targeted the high-performance computing market. , Nvidia Teslas power some of the world's fastest supercomputers, including Summit at Oak Ridge National Laboratory and Tianhe-1A, in Tianjin, China.

Tesla cards have four times the double precision performance of a Fermi-based Nvidia GeForce card of similar single precision performance.
Unlike Nvidia's consumer GeForce cards and professional Nvidia Quadro cards, Tesla cards were originally unable to output images to a display. However, the last Tesla C-class products included one Dual-Link DVI port.

As part of Project Denver, Nvidia intends to embed ARMv8 processor cores in its GPUs. This will be a 64-bit follow-up to the 32-bit Tegra chips.

The Tesla P100 uses TSMC's 16 nanometer FinFET semiconductor manufacturing process, which is more advanced than the 28-nanometer process previously used by AMD and Nvidia GPUs between 2012 and 2016. The P100 also uses Samsung's HBM2 memory.

Applications
Tesla products are primarily used in simulations and in large-scale calculations (especially floating-point calculations), and for high-end image generation for professional and scientific fields.

In 2013, the defense industry accounted for less than one-sixth of Tesla sales, but Sumit Gupta predicted increasing sales to the geospatial intelligence market.

Specifications

See also
 List of Nvidia graphics processing units
 Nvidia Tesla Personal Supercomputer
 Ampere (microarchitecture)
Fastra II

References

External links

 NVIDIA Data Center GPUs
 NVIDIA Product Overview and Technical Brief
 NVIDIA's Tesla homepage
cpu under 100
 Nvidia Nsight

Coprocessors
GPGPU
Tesla
Parallel computing
Graphics cards